Yun Dong-ju or Yoon Dong-ju (December 30, 1917 – February 16, 1945) was a Korean poet born in Longing, Jilin, China, who was known for his lyric poetries as well as the resistance poetries against the Japanese colonialism during Japan's occupation of Korea, longing for Korea's liberation.

After studying at the Myeongdong School, he moved to Pyongyang and graduated from Soongsil Middle School (now Soongsil High School in Seoul). He later moved to Seoul and attended Yonhi College. During his second year at Yonhi College, he published a poem in the boy magazine, and officially appeared in the paragraph. After crossing over to Japan, he entered Kyoto Doshisha University in 1942 but was arrested by the Japanese police for alleged anti-Japanese movements in 1943. While imprisoned in a Fukuoka, he died at the age of 27, leaving over 100 poems. His cause of death in Fukuoka prison is uncertain, but theories have been raised based on accounts of saltwater injections and medical experiments performed at that prison. His book, The Sky, the Wind, the Stars, and the Poem (하늘과 바람과 별과 詩), was published posthumously.

He was recognized as one of the conscientious intellectuals in the latter half of the Japanese colonial period, and his poems were based on criticism and self-reflection of the Japanese colonial government and the Joseon Governor-General. His friend and cousin, Song Mong-Gyu, was also arrested while trying to join the independence movement and was classified as a subject of Japanese experimentation in Japan. While in Japan, he adopted the Japanese name, Hiranuma (平沼). In addition to his Korean name, the nicknames Dongju and Yunju were also used.

Life

Yun Dong-Ju was born as the eldest son among the four children of his father Yun Yeong-Seok and his mother Kim Yong at Mingdong village in Longjing, where many Korean settlers in China lived during the Japanese occupation of Korea. As a child, he was called "Haehwan" (해환, 海煥 ). He entered Eunjin Middle School in Longjing in 1932 and moved to Pyeongyang to attend Soongsil Middle School in 1936. When the school was closed down in the same year he moved back to Longjing. On December 27, 1941, aged 23, he graduated from Yonhi College, in Seoul which later became Yonsei University.

He had been writing poetry from time to time and chose 19 poems to publish in a collection he intended to call "Sky, Wind, Star, and Poem" (하늘과 바람과 별과 시), but he was unable to get it published.

After crossing over to Japan, entering Kyoto Doshisha University in 1942, arrested by the Japanese police for an independence movement in 1943, imprisoned in a Fukuoka prison, leaving over 100 poems and died in prison at the age of 27. The view that the signing of the Japanese saltwater Vivo and after his death the Japanese by Maruta is uncertain, but raising theories, biological experiments.

In 1948 three collections of his handwritten manuscripts were published posthumously as "The Heavens and the Wind and the Stars and Poetry" (Haneulgwa Baramgwa Byeolgwa Si). With the appearance of this volume Yun came into the spotlight as a Resistance poet of the late occupation period.

In November 1968, Yonsei University and others established an endowment for the Yun Tong-Ju Poetry Prize. In 2007, he was listed by the Korean Poets' Association among the ten most important modern Korean poets.

Work
The Literature Translation Institute of Korea summarizes Yun's contributions to Korean literature:

 Yun’s poetry is notable for the childlike persona of his narrators, sensitive awareness of a lost hometown, and an unusual scapegoat mentality deriving from a sense of shame at not being able to lead a conscientious life in a period of gloomy social realities. "Life and Death" (Salmgwa jugeum) is representative of the poems dating from 1934 to 1936, his period of literary apprenticeship. It describes the conflict between life and death, or light and darkness, but its poetic framework is more or less crude. From 1937 onwards, however, his poems reveal ruthless introspection and anxiety about the dark realities of the times. The poems of this later period reach clear literary fruition in terms of their reflection on the inner self and their recognition of nationalist realities, as embodied in the poet's own experiences. In particular, they evince a steely spirit that attempts to overcome anxiety, loneliness, and despair and to surmount contemporary realities through hope and courage.

Collection of poems 

 New Myeong-dong
 Another Hometown
 Sky, Wind, Star, and Poem
 Those Who love the stars

etc...

Sky, Wind, Star and Poem 
In January 1948, 31 of his poems were published by Jeongeumsa (正音社), together with an introduction by the fellow poet Chong Ji-yong; this work was also titled Sky, Wind, Star, and Poem. His poetry had a huge impact. In 1976, Yun's relatives collected his other poems and added them to a third edition of the book. The poems that are in this edition (116 in total) are considered to be most of Yun's works.

In a 1986 survey, he was selected as 'the most popular poet amongst the youth' and his popularity continues to this day.

The following are two English translations of the foreword to his collection, dated November 20, 1941:

In 2020, Korean-American Byun Man-sik translated Yoon Dong-ju's representative poems as Yoon Dong-ju: Selected Poems into English.

In popular culture 
In Lee Jung-myung's novel The Investigation (the title of the English translation of original Korean novel) is, inter alia, "an imaginative paean to" Yun.

In 2007, Yun Dongju is recited by "Sam", on South Korean television series "I Am Sam (TV series)", in episode 13.

In 2011, Yun Dong-Ju Shoots the Moon, a musical based on his life, was performed by the Seoul Performing Arts Company.

The movie DongJu: The Portrait of a Poet was released in February 2016. It depicts the lives of Yun Dong-Ju and Song Mong-kyu in the setting of the Japanese colonial era. Yun is portrayed by actor Kang Ha-Neul. Several theaters screened the movie with English subtitles.

On December 31 episode of Infinite Challenge featured the climax of the history and hip-hop, Kwanghee and Gaeko featuring Oh Hyuk from Hyukoh performed song title "Your Night" inspired from Yun Dong-ju life and poet.

On 30 December 2010, Google Doodle celebrated the Birthday of Yun Dong-ju.

See also 
 List of Korean-language poets
 Korean independence movement
 Korean literature

References 
 
 Choi, Dong-Ho. 2002. "A Study of Intertextuality between Yoon Dong Ju's 'Another Hometown' and Lee Sang's 'The Lineage': Centering on the Poetic Word 'the Skeleton',"  Journal of the Research Society of Language and Literature 39: 309–325. [in Korean]

References

External links 

 

1917 births
1945 deaths
Korean Presbyterians
Korean independence activists
Literature of Korea under Japanese rule
Korean male poets
Prisoners who died in Japanese detention
Korean people who died in prison custody
20th-century Korean poets
Yonsei University alumni
Rikkyo University alumni
Doshisha University alumni
20th-century male writers
Papyeong Yun clan